Nicole Ashley Hayes, known professionally as Nikki Hayes, is an American R&B singer, songwriter and dancer born in Chicago, Illinois and is now based in Arizona.

Early life 

Nicole Ashley Hayes was born on September 27, 1995, in Chicago, Illinois. When she was 6 years old, she studied dance at Studio One Dance Academy in Chicago, and went on to join the choir and dance team at St. Sabina Academy. Before entering her teenaged years, she joined Walt Whitman and The Soul Children of Chicago. She has since studied Jazz, West African, Ballet and Modern dance styles, before electing to start her solo singing career.

Career 

In the early stages of her career, Nikki Hayes placed in the final five of Grammy Award winning producer Kuk Harrell's “Who's Next? Worldwide Online Talent Search”.

In 2018, Nikki Hayes released her first single, “Move”, which earned her a nomination for an Independent Music Award for Best Song - R&B/Soul, and a feature on Tyler Perry's Sistas (TV series) soundtrack, as well as a spot on The CW's All American (TV series) and ABC's For Life (TV series).

Her second single “Stingray” was released in April 2019. and was followed that September by "Together", which was featured on TNT's Claws (TV series). 2020 began with the release of "Gotta Go To Sleep", and most recently "Sweet".

Musical style 
Nikki Hayes' musical style has been described as R&B and Soul, and has cited as musical and career influences Whitney Houston, Toni Braxton, Stevie Wonder, and Beyoncé.

Discography

Singles

Music videos

Awards and nominations

References

External links
 Official website

1995 births
21st-century American women singers
American contemporary R&B singers
American women hip hop musicians
American women hip hop singers
American women pop singers
American soul singers
21st-century African-American women singers
African-American women singer-songwriters
Living people
Singers from Chicago
21st-century American singers
Singer-songwriters from Illinois